Wacław Leszczyński (born 15 August 1605 in Baranów; died 1 April 1666 in Łyszkowice) - Bishop of Warmia 1644–1659, Archbishop of Gniezno from 1658, Primate of Poland, Provost of the Płock cathedral chapter in 1643-1644, representative diplomatic mission of the Commonwealth in the Kingdom of France in 1645.

References

External links
 Virtual tour Gniezno Cathedral 
List of Primates of Poland 

1605 births
1666 deaths
17th-century Roman Catholic bishops in the Polish–Lithuanian Commonwealth
People from Grodzisk Mazowiecki County